The Silas Sherrill House is a historic house at the southwest corner of 4th and Spring Streets in Hardy, Arkansas.  It is a 1–1/2 story structure, fashioned out of rough-cut native stone, uncoursed and finished with beaded mortar.  It has a side gable roof with knee brackets in the extended gable ends, and brick chimneys with contrasting colors and gabled caps.  A gable-roof dormer pierces the front facade roof, with stuccoed wall finish, exposed rafter tails, and knee brackets. The front has a single-story shed-roof porch extending its full width, supported by piers of conglomerated stone, and with a fieldstone balustrade.  Built in 1927–28, it is a fine local example of craftsman architecture executed in stone.

The house was listed on the National Register of Historic Places in 1998.

See also
National Register of Historic Places listings in Sharp County, Arkansas

References

Houses on the National Register of Historic Places in Arkansas
Houses completed in 1928
Houses in Sharp County, Arkansas
National Register of Historic Places in Sharp County, Arkansas